Atresmedia Corporación de Medios de Comunicación, S.A., previously Grupo Antena 3, is a Spanish media group, present in the television, radio and filmmaking industries. Significant shareholders include Grupo Planeta and Bertelsmann.

On 6 March 2013, Grupo Antena 3 was renamed Atresmedia, thereby Antena 3 de Televisión changed to Atresmedia Televisión.

Divisions

Television
Atresmedia operates several channels through Atresmedia Televisión of which Antena 3 and laSexta are the flagship channels. In addition to these channels, Atresmedia Televisión operates three other national terrestrial channels - Neox, Nova and Mega.  Until 5 May 2014 Xplora, Nitro, laSexta3 were also broadcast. In December 2015, Atresmedia Televisión started to air Atreseries, an HD national terrestrial channel centered on fiction TV series.

Radio
Atresmedia operates three radio stations through Atresmedia Radio - Onda Cero, Europa FM and Melodía FM.

Film

Atresmedia Cine is the division responsible for producing film content. Atresmedia Cine is one of the most prominent Spanish and Latin American film producers. It was created in 2000.

Publishing
Atresmedia Publicidad is the division responsible for producing advertising material.

Event Management
Atresmedia Eventos is the division responsible for management of public events.

Web Content
Atresmedia Digital is the division responsible for management of internet content.

In addition to content from the free-to-air linear television channels, it offers access to exclusive and original content for Premium subscribers — under the Atresplayer Premium brand —, access to additional foreign serials and telenovelas for Novelas Nova subscribers, and access to original content under the Flooxer brand.

Corporate affairs

Headquarters
Atresmedia's corporate headquarters are located on the outskirts of Madrid, in the municipality of San Sebastián de los Reyes.

Chairmen
 1989–1992: Javier Godó
 1992–1997: Antonio Asensio
 1997–2001: José María Mas Millet
 2001–2003: Enrique Álvarez
 2003–2015: José Manuel Lara Bosch
 2015–present: José Creuheras

Shareholding
The majority shareholders of Atresmedia are Grupo Planeta-DeAgostini, S.L. (44.54%) and UFA Film- und Fernsehen GmbH (20.49%).

References

External links
Official
 Official website

Financial
 Atresmedia Corporación de Medios de Comunicación, S.A. — Google Finance
 Atresmedia Corporación de Medios de Comunicación, S.A. — Hoover's

 
Companies based in the Community of Madrid
Mass media companies established in 1988
Spanish brands
RTL Group
Companies listed on the Madrid Stock Exchange